The streak-breasted scimitar babbler (Pomatorhinus ruficollis) is a species of bird in the family Timaliidae.

It is found in Bangladesh, Bhutan, China, India, Laos, Myanmar, Nepal, and Vietnam. Its natural habitat is subtropical or tropical moist montane forest. The former Taiwan subspecies musicus is usually now considered a distinct species as the Taiwan scimitar babbler.

References

Collar, N. J. & Robson, C. 2007. Family Timaliidae (Babblers)  pp. 70 – 291 in; del Hoyo, J., Elliott, A. & Christie, D.A. eds. Handbook of the Birds of the World, Vol. 12. Picathartes to Tits and Chickadees. Lynx Edicions, Barcelona.

streak-breasted scimitar babbler
Birds of North India
Birds of Nepal
Birds of Eastern Himalaya
Birds of South China
Birds of Vietnam
streak-breasted scimitar babbler
Taxonomy articles created by Polbot